Sólo con tu pareja is a 1991 Mexican film by Alfonso Cuarón.

This was the first full-feature film for Cuarón who had previously worked at Televisa, a Mexican television company. The stars of this film are Daniel Giménez Cacho (the narrator on Cuarón's second Mexican film Y tu mamá también) and telenovela star Claudia Ramírez.

After Alfonso Cuarón and his brother Carlos Cuarón wrote the script, they needed to secure financing. The government of Mexico's IMCINE (Instituto Mexicano de Cinematografía) had already decided what films they would finance that year. However, one of the projects was canceled and the IMCINE funds were assigned to Sólo con tu pareja.

After the film was completed, the Mexican government refused to distribute it, but Sólo con tu pareja was presented at several international festivals. It won awards at the Ariel Awards (by the Mexican Academy of Film) and at the Toronto Festival of Festivals. After this international recognition the movie was finally shown in 1993 in its country of origin, where it became a box-office success. It occupies the 87th place on the list of the 100 best movies of the cinema of Mexico.

In 2006, Criterion Collection released Sólo con tu pareja in DVD (Region 1), with a new remastered transfer and with the shorts Noche de Bodas by Carlos Cuarón and Cuarteto Para el Fin Del Tiempo (Alfonso Cuarón's first short, made when he was a film student in 1983).

Plot
Tomás Tomás, a womanizing bachelor who works in advertising, is having an affair with his boss Gloria. After visiting his doctor Mateo, who is also his friend and neighbor, he is struck by the new nurse Silvia and starts an affair with her too. When she finds out about Gloria, she falsifies the results of his blood test, notifying him that he has AIDS. He meanwhile has been struck by his neighbour Clarisa, a flight attendant engaged to a pilot Carlos, but realizes he cannot pursue her now.

In despair at his fate, he decides to commit suicide. While contemplating various methods, Clarisa bursts in in despair. She has found Carlos in bed with another woman and wants to end her life, so the two decide to go to the Torre Latinoamericana and jump from the top. Tomás leaves a voice message for Mateo and in the middle of the night the pair set off. When Mateo gets the message among friends at a party, he rushes to the Torre with the whole group, including his wife Teresa, Carlos, and Silvia.

At the top, Tomás tells Clarisa he loves her but can go no further because he has AIDS. She says, since they are both about to die, that does not now matter and the two make ecstatic love. Climbing the emergency stairs, Silvia calls out that the blood test was not positive. Instead of jumping, the lovers think about marrying.

Awards

Ariel Award in 1992
Best Original Story - Alfonso Cuarón & Carlos Cuarón

Also nominated for:
Best Cinematography - Emmanuel Lubezki
Best First Feature Film - Alfonso Cuarón
Best Screenplay - Alfonso Cuarón & Carlos Cuarón

Cast
 Daniel Giménez Cacho as Tomás Tomás
 Claudia Ramírez as Clarisa Negrete
 Luis de Icaza as doctor Mateo Mateos
 Dobrina Liubomirova as Silvia Silva
 Astrid Hadad as Teresa de Teresa
 Isabel Benet as Gloria Gold
 Toshirô Hisaki as Takeshi
 Carlos Nakasone as Koyi
 Ricardo Dalmacci as Carlos
 Claudia Fernández as Lucía
 Luz María Jerez as Paola
 Nevil Wilton as Pasmal
 John Keys as  Absolut Boozer
 Raúl Valerio as guard at the Torre Latinoamericana
 Montserrat Ontiveros as Mrs. Panza
 Regina Orozco as Mrs. Dolores
 Rodolfo Arias as Hernán Cortés on the commercial for "Jalapeños Caseros Gómez"
 Víctor Carpinteiro as Montezuma on the commercial for "Jalapeños Caseros Gómez"
 Claudette Maillé as la Burbus
 Ariel López Padilla as Burbus' boyfriend
 Marcos Mohar as boy at the elevator
 Jiussana Briseño as Nancy of Continental Airlines
 Arturo Ríos as contratenor in a dream about the Mexicana de Aviación plane
 Adriana Olivera as voice of the beeper operator
 Jonás Cuarón as Kid at Wedding

External links
 Sólo con tu pareja  at the Cinema of Mexico page of the ITESM
 
 
Sólo con tu pareja: Sex, Lies, and Mariachis an essay by Ryan F. Long at the Criterion Collection

1991 films
1990s Spanish-language films
1991 directorial debut films
1991 romantic comedy films
Estudios Churubusco films
Films directed by Alfonso Cuarón
Films produced by Alfonso Cuarón
Films set in Mexico City
Films with screenplays by Alfonso Cuarón
Mexican romantic comedy films
Warner Bros. films
1990s Mexican films